The 2010–11 season was Associazione Sportiva Roma's 83rd in existence and 78th season in the top flight of Italian football. Claudio Ranieri began his second season as coach, but resigned as manager on 20 February 2011. He was immediately replaced by Vincenzo Montella as a caretaker for the rest of the season.

After a second-place finish in 2009–10, Roma hoped to improve their position to capture their fourth Scudetto, but finished a disappointing sixth.

Roma competed in the Champions League after not qualifying in 2009–10. Roma faced Internazionale in the 2010 Supercoppa Italiana on 21 August, losing 3–1.

Players

Squad information
Last updated on 22 May 2011
Appearances include league matches only

Transfers

In

Out

Pre-season and friendlies
Roma's pre-season began on July 15.  27 players took part in the training camp at Riscone di Brunico.

After three friendlies in camp, the squad took part in the Tournoi de Paris, a tournament featuring Ligue 1 clubs Paris Saint-Germain and Bordeaux.

Pre-season preparations ended on a low note; Roma travelled to face Superleague Greece giants Olympiacos, losing 5–1.

Off the pitch, part of the pre-season was dominated by the news that several companies formed to oversee the sale of the club.

Competitions

Overall

Last updated: 22 May 2011

Supercoppa Italiana

Roma qualified for the 2010 Supercoppa Italiana after finishing runner-up to Internazionale in both the league and cup.

On August 21, Inter and Roma kicked off the season at the San Siro.  After Roma opened the scoring through a John Arne Riise goal midway through the first half, Inter started their comeback before the end of the half thanks to Goran Pandev.  Two second half goals from Samuel Eto'o secured Inter's fifth Supercoppa title.

Serie A

League table

Results summary

Results by round

Matches

Coppa Italia

UEFA Champions League

Group stage

Knockout phase

Round of 16

Statistics

Appearances and goals

|-
! colspan=14 style="background:#B21B1C; color:#FFD700; text-align:center"| Goalkeepers

|-
! colspan=14 style="background:#B21B1C; color:#FFD700; text-align:center"| Defenders

|-
! colspan=14 style="background:#B21B1C; color:#FFD700; text-align:center"| Midfielders

|-
! colspan=14 style="background:#B21B1C; color:#FFD700; text-align:center"| Forwards

|-
! colspan=14 style="background:#B21B1C; color:#FFD700; text-align:center"| Players transferred out during the season

Goalscorers

Last updated: 22 May 2011

Clean sheets

Last updated: 22 May 2011

Disciplinary record

Last updated:

References

A.S. Roma seasons
Roma
Roma